Celal Şener (born 10 September 1973) is a Turkish cross-country skier. He competed in the men's 10 kilometre classical event at the 1992 Winter Olympics.

References

1973 births
Living people
Turkish male cross-country skiers
Olympic cross-country skiers of Turkey
Cross-country skiers at the 1992 Winter Olympics
Place of birth missing (living people)
20th-century Turkish people